The Tigers of Ambazonia (TTA) are an Ambazonian separatist militia. According to its official website, the TTA recognizes the authority of the Interim Government of Ambazonia. It is part of the Ambazonia Self-Defence Council.

The TTA started off in the fall of 2017 in Manyu, with between 10 and 30 fighters. As of 2018, it claimed to have around 2,000 fighters under its command, though this number cannot be verified and is likely an exaggeration. It cooperates with the larger Ambazonia Defence Forces and SOCADEF.

The TTA claimed responsibility for the September 2018 Wum prison break.

References

External links 
Amba Tigers - Official site

 

Military of Ambazonia
National liberation movements in Africa
Secessionist organizations
Guerrilla organizations